Mashina Vremeni is a Russian rock band founded in 1969. Mashina Vremeni was a pioneer of Soviet rock music and remains one of the oldest still-active rock bands in Russia. The band's music incorporates elements of classic rock, blues, and bard's song. Mashina Vremeni's best known members are Andrei Makarevich (founder, principal singer-songwriter, public face of the band), Alexander Kutikov (bass player and producer/sound engineer), and Evgeny Margulis (guitarist/songwriter).

History

Andrei Makarevich's musical career can be traced to a school band called The Kids, which was made up of two male guitarists and two female vocalists. The group sang mostly English-language folk songs and performed primarily at talent shows put on in Moscow schools. According to Makarevich, the momentous event in his musical career came when the Soviet group VIA Atlanty visited his school and allowed him to play a couple of songs on their equipment during a break in the performance. On the heels of this experience, Makarevich joined with other musically talented students from his school and another school to form Mashiny Vremeni ( – in plural form imitating The Beatles, The Rolling Stones, etc.). The most significant founding members included Sergey Kawagoe and Andrey Makarevich. The band's repertoire consisted of eleven songs in English, now lost.

Mashina Vremeni started playing during the last years of the Brezhnev era, but could not get official bookings as a professional band. In 1979 Makarevich signed the band up with Rosconcert, becoming legitimate in the State music system.

Timeline
 1971 – Alexander Kutikov becomes the bass player, introducing more of buoyant rock-n-roll into the band's material
 1972 – Line-up losses in the band as several members are drafted into service (which to this day is compulsory in Russia)
 1973 – Tensions between Sergey Kawagoe and Alexander Kutikov; the latter leaves the band for a hard rock outfit Visokosnoe Leto (Leap Year Summer)
 1974 – Sergey Kawagoe leaves, Alexander Kutikov returns. However, Kawagoe also returns after about six months. The band performs with the following line-up: Andrei Makarevich, Alexander Kutikov, Sergey Kawagoe, and Alexey Romanov (future leader of another prominent Russian band Voskreseniye ("Resurrection" or "Sunday"))
 1975 – Romanov and Kutikov suddenly depart. Evgeny Margulis joins on guitar
 1976 – Mashina Vremeni is invited to a festival "Songs of youth in Tallinn – 76" and performs there with a great success. Many people join (including couple of violinists) and leave after some time during this year.
 1978 – First studio record of Mashina Vremeni. Alexander Kutikov, though playing in Visokosnoe Leto, was also working in sound-recording studio in order to help the band gain access to good equipment. The record is now known as Eto bylo tak davno ("It was so long ago").
 1979 – Band in crisis. Sergey Kawagoe and Evgeny Margulis leave the band and join Voskresenie. At this time, Andrei Makarevich writes one of the band's most enduring and popular songs: "Poka gorit svecha" ("As long as the candle burns"), as a statement of his not giving up. After some time of frustration, Alexander Kutikov saves the situation by leaving the Visokosnoe Leto band and bringing Valeriy Efremov (also from Visokosnoe Leto) as drummer and Pyotr Podgorodetsky on the keyboards.
 1980 – The beginning of the golden era of Mashina Vremeni. The band wins the festival "Spring Rhythms 80" main award and continues its concert tour. However, they are only allowed this because of musical freedom indulgences given in light of 1980 Olympic Games in Moscow.
 1981 – The song "Povorot" stays on the top of charts for 18 months. The band composes the soundtrack to the popular movie Dusha, starring Sofia Rotaru watched by more than 57 million cinema-goers in the Soviet Union.
 1982 – Repressions begin in earnest with a denouncing article "'Blue Bird' ragout" ("Blue Bird" was a popular song of the band) which describes the band's output as depressive and ideologically unsound. A nationwide wave of protest against the denunciation sends thousands of fan letters to newspaper editors. Pyotr Podgorodetsky leaves; Alexandr Zaitsev replaces him.
 1986 – Best songs 1979–1985 compilation is recorded. Album V dobriy chas ("Good Luck") is recorded.
 1987 – Reki i Mosty ("Rivers and Bridges") album recorded. It is considered Mashina Vremeni's first official album (all the previous ones were recorded illegally, for underground distribution). First appearances on the television. The band performs at Live Aid 2 festival in Japan.
 1988 – First international tours – USA, Canada, Greece, Spain and Bulgaria.
 1989 – V kruge sveta ("In the circle of light") album is released.
 1990 – Alexandr Zaitsev leaves and Evgeny Margulis and Pyotr Podgorodetsky join the band once again.
 1991 – Medlennaya khoroshaya muzyka ("Slow good music") album is released.
 1993 – Alexander Kutikov's company "Sintez Records" releases retro albums Best songs 1979–1985 and That was so long ago. Album Vneshtatniy komandir Zemli ("Part-time commander of the Earth") is released.
 1994 – Acoustic live album Unplugged is recorded and released. 25th anniversary is celebrated in a 7-hour concert on the Red Square featuring Chaif, Nautilus Pompilius, Garik Sukachov and Bravo.
 1995 – Compilation of old unpublished songs is released.
 1996 – Kartonniye krylia lubvi ("Cardboard wings of love") album is released.
 1996 –  ("20 years later") album is released.
 1997 – Otryvayas ("Breaking away") album is released.
 1999 – The 30th anniversary of the band. A massive concert, usually considered to be the band's best ever, takes place in the main stadium of "sport-complex Olympiyskiy" im Moscow. Chasy i znaki ("Hours and signs") album is released. Petr Podgorodetskiy leaves due to tensions. Andrey Derzhavin takes his place on the keyboard.
 2001 – Mesto gde svet ("The place where there's light") album is released.
 2004 – 35th anniversary of the band. A concert featuring 35 selected songs is played at the Red Square. Mashinalno ("Mechanically") album is released.
 2005 – Live album Kremlin rocks is released. The band performed with the Kremlin chamber orchestra "Kremlin".
 2006 – Sintez Records releases a compilation called Mashina vremeni – chast' 1 ("Time Machine – Part 1"). The band records a new album (which is called in English Time machine) at famous Studio 2 at Abbey Road Studios.
 2007 – The group releases the Time machine album.
 2009 – The band celebrates its 40th anniversary with a large concert.
 2010 – The band continues to celebrate its 40th anniversary with a seven-stop North American tour

Musical style
Mashina Vremeni's sound is eclectic and incorporates multiple different genres. Contributions to song composition have been made by almost every band member, and often reflect each member's particular stylistic preferences. Makarevich is a fan of The Beatles, and many of his songs reflect the Beatles' influence. He is also influenced by blues music and Soviet singer-songwriters, the so-called "bards". Kutikov is a quintessential rocker, he composes guitar-oriented hard rock. Margulis is one of the Russia's best known bluesmen, and his songs are usually blues rock ballads.

The majority of the band's lyrics are written by Makarevich. They were often metaphorical fables that made allegorical puns relating to life in the Soviet and Post-Soviet eras.

Albums

Line-up

Current line-up 
 Andrey Makarevich — lead vocals, guitar (1969 — present)
 Alexander Kutikov — bass-guitar, vocals (1971 — 1975, 1979 — present)
 * Valeriy Efremov — drums, percussion (1979 — present)

Touring musicians

 Sergey Ostroumov — additional percussions (regular on live performances, 2004–2019) †
 Alexandr Ditkovsky — trumpet (regular on live performances since 2004)
 Igor Homich — guitar (regular on live performances since 2012)

Former members 
 Sergey Kawagoe — bass-guitar (1969–1971), keyboards (1971–1975), drums (1975–1979) †
 Evgeny Margulis — guitar, bass-guitar, vocals (1975–1979, 1990–2012)
 Pyotr Podgorodetsky — keyboards, vocals (1979–1982, 1990–1999)
 Alexander Zaicev — keyboards (1982–1990) †
 Sergey Rizenko — viola (1982–1983)
 Yuri Borzov — drums (1969–1971)
 Maxim Kapitanovsky — drums (1971–1973) †
 Yuri Fokin — drums (1973–1975)
 Andrei Derzhavin — keyboards, vocals (2000 — 2017)

Timeline

Involvement in public debate
During the Russo-Ukrainian War frontman Andrey Makarevich denounced Russian military intervention in Crimea and eastern Ukraine. Other people associated with the band kept a low profile in the matter through 2014, but in 2015 it became known that at least Kutikov was against Russian policy in Ukraine, while Derzhavin and director/manager Vladimir Sapunov sided with President Vladimir Putin's policies.

References

External links

 Official site
 Biography of the band
 Russmus info on the band
 

Musical groups from Moscow
Russian rock music groups
Soviet rock music groups
Musical groups established in 1969
Russian National Music Award winners
Winners of the Golden Gramophone Award